2006 in television may refer to:

2006 in Albanian television
2006 in American television
2006 in Australian television
2006 in Belgian television
2006 in Brazilian television
2006 in British television
2006 in Canadian television
2006 in Croatian television
2006 in Czech television
2006 in Danish television
2006 in Dutch television
2006 in Estonian television
2006 in French television
2006 in German television
2006 in Indonesian television
2006 in Irish television
2006 in Israeli television
2006 in Italian television
2006 in Japanese television
2006 in New Zealand television
2006 in Norwegian television
2006 in Pakistani television
2006 in Philippine television
2006 in Polish television
2006 in Portuguese television
2006 in Scottish television
2006 in South African television
2006 in Spanish television
2006 in Swedish television

 
Mass media timelines by year